Bhakta Markandeya is an Indian Hindu mythological film shot simultaneously in Tamil and Kannada languages by B. S. Ranga with a different supporting cast in each of the versions. Master Anand played the titular role of Markandeya in both the versions. The film was released in 1957.

Plot
The theme of the story is the nullification of the powers of Yama (the God of Death) by Lord Shiva.

Lord Shiva blesses sage Mrukanda Maharshi and his wife with a child. Their child, Markandeya, was given a lease of 16 years to live in this world. But the child worships Lord Shiva with unlimited Bhakthi (devotion). When he completes 16 years of age, Yama comes to take his life as appointed. Markandeya grips the Shivalinga and Lord Shiva appears before Yama and tells him not to take Markandeya's life, because he (Lord Shiva) has blessed the boy. So, Markandeya becomes an immortal. The moral of the story is that one who surrenders to God need not worry about death.

Cast

Tamil version

Master Anand as Markandeya

V. Nagayya

Pushpavalli

K. A. Thangavelu

Babuji

Padmini Priyadarshini

Sairam

Balasaraswathi

Surya Kala

Lakshmikantham

R. Nagendra Rao

Sundaram

Kannada version

Master Anand

R Nagendra Rao

T R Narasimha Raju

Dikki Madhava Rao

V. Nagayya

Comedian Guggu

H R Hanumantha Rao

K Pushpavalli

B Ramadevi

Raghuramaiah

Surya kala

Padmini Priyadarshini

Crew
Producer &
Director: B. S. Ranga
Dialogues: Thuraiyur Murthi (Tamil) Chi Sadashivaiah (Kannada)
Editing: P. G. Mohan, M. Devendranathan
Choreography: Chopra
Photography: R. Vekatachary
Studio: Vikram

Soundtrack
Tamil songs

Music was composed by the duo Viswanathan–Ramamoorthy, while the lyrics were penned by A. Marthakasi. Singer is V. Nagayya. Playback singers are V. N. Sundharam, P. B. Srinivas, S. C. Krishnan, Sivaraman, P. Leela, A. P. Komala, K. Jamuna Rani, Satthiyavathi, Soolamangalam Rajalakshmi, P. Susheela & R. Balasaraswathi Devi.

Kannada songs

The music was composed by  Viswanathan–Ramamoorthy

References

1950s Tamil-language films
Films scored by Viswanathan–Ramamoorthy
Hindu mythological films
Hindu devotional films
Indian biographical films
1950s biographical films